Baby John (25 October 1917 – 27 January 2008) was a senior leader of the Kerala Revolutionary Socialist Party (Baby John). Previously, he was General Secretary of the Revolutionary Socialist Party in India. He was known in the Kerala state political circles as ‘Kerala Kissinger’ for his abilities to manage political crises at times when the state was passing through difficult political phases.

Legislative career 
Baby's legislative career began in the early 1950s, when he was elected to the Travancore-Cochin Assembly. After the formation of Kerala state, he was elected to the Kerala Legislative Assembly from 1960 to 1996, mostly from his home constituency Chavara. He had served as minister; handling different portfolios in coalition governments led by the C. Achutha Menon, K. Karunakaran, A. K. Antony, P. K. Vasudevan Nair, and E. K. Nayanar.

References

External links
Baby John mourned
Veteran Communist leader Baby John dead
Baby John death anniversary observance
Baby John turns 90

Malayali politicians
1917 births
2008 deaths
Kerala MLAs 1960–1964
Kerala MLAs 1967–1970
Kerala MLAs 1982–1987
Kerala MLAs 1991–1996
Kerala MLAs 1970–1977
Kerala MLAs 1977–1979
Kerala MLAs 1980–1982
Kerala MLAs 1987–1991
Kerala MLAs 1996–2001
Revolutionary Socialist Party (India) politicians
State cabinet ministers of Kerala
Education Ministers of Kerala